McAlister's Deli is an American chain of fast casual restaurants founded in 1989 in Oxford, Mississippi, by retired dentist Dr. Don Newcomb. There are currently over 500 locations in 29 states. The menu includes deli sandwiches, "giant spuds" (baked potatoes), soups, salads, and desserts, as well as catering items such as sandwich trays and boxed lunches. The chain is also known for its McAlister's Famous Sweet Tea, which is available by the glass or by the gallon.

McAlister's Deli - together with Schlotzsky's, Carvel, Moe's Southwest Grill, Cinnabon, Jamba, and Auntie Anne's - is part of the Focus Brands portfolio of brands.

History

The original restaurant was started in a renovated gas station, and many of the elements of that original look are present in many McAlister's Delis built today, such as a garage door and nostalgic black-and-white tile. The deli originally opened under the name Checker's and was later changed to McAlister's.

In 1999, founder Don Newcomb sold the company to CEO Michael J. Stack and executive Philip Friedman for an undisclosed amount. Stack replaced Newcomb while retaining his CEO position. Newcomb remained in the company as a board director and as an exclusive franchisee for Kentucky. At the time of the sale, McAlister's Deli had 45 franchised and company-owned locations in the Southeast.

Roark Capital Group acquired McAlister's Deli in 2005. At the time of the acquisition, McAlister's Deli had 170 franchised and company-owned locations in 19 states.

Most McAlister's Deli restaurants are owned and operated by independent franchisees, ranging from single-location, family-owned operations, to larger, multi-unit groups such as JME, Inc., DMAC 81 LLC (with locations in Alabama, Georgia, South Carolina and North Carolina), and The Saxton Group. The Saxton Group is the largest franchisee of McAlister's Deli, operating over 75 locations in Texas, Oklahoma, Missouri, Kansas, Iowa, and Nebraska. The chain's headquarters is located in Atlanta, Georgia.

See also

 List of delicatessens

References

External links
 
 McAlister's Deli official Franchise website

Fast casual restaurants
Lafayette County, Mississippi
Restaurants in Mississippi
Restaurants established in 1989
Fast-food chains of the United States
Delicatessens in the United States
1989 establishments in Mississippi
American companies established in 1989
2005 mergers and acquisitions
Companies based in Sandy Springs, Georgia